Let the Sunshine is a 2010 play by David Williamson.

The play received its world premiere at the Ensemble Theatre in Sydney.

References

External reviews
Review at Stage Whispers
Review of 2010 Melbourne production at The Age
Review of 2010 Melbourne production at Crikey

Plays by David Williamson
2010 plays